The World Games are an international multi-sport event for sports that are not contested in the Olympic Games. World Games may also refer to:

 Women's World Games, athletics international women's Games organized from 1922 to 1934
 World Games (video game), multi-sport simulation game
 World Games Stadium, Kaohsiung, Taiwan
 Military World Games, multi-sport event for military personnel
 Special Olympics World Games, international sporting competition for athletes with intellectual disabilities
 World Games for the Deaf, former name for the Deaflympics

Similar spelling
 word game